P. Parameswaran (3 October 1927 – 9 February 2020), often referred to as Parameswarji, was a Rashtriya Swayamsevak Sangh (RSS) pracharak from Kerala, India who was erstwhile Vice‑President of the Jan Sangh.

He was president of Vivekananda Kendra, (which was awarded the 2015 Gandhi Peace Prize) and has been conferred with  Padma Vibhushan, India's second highest civilian award, in 2018. He died on 9 February 2020 due to age-related illnesses

Childhood 

Born in Thamarasseril Illam, Muhamma village in Alappuzha district in the year 1927, Parameswaran after his schooling at his birthplace, continued his studies at St. Berchmans College, Changanacherry and graduated from University College, Thiruvananthapuram with distinctions in BA (Hons.) in History. From early childhood, he had a great inclination towards the study of Hinduism. He was intimately connected with most of the Hindu social and cultural organizations.

Ideology 

He came into contact with the Rashtriya Swayamsevak Sangh (RSS) during his student days. He was also a disciple of Swami Agamananda. Parameswaran became an RSS pracharak (full-time organizer) in 1950, as per the direction of M. S. Golwalkar (Guruji), who was the Sarsanghchalak of RSS. He served as organizing secretary of Bharatiya Jana Sangh in 1957. In 1968, he became an All‑India General Secretary and later Vice‑President of the Jan Sangh. He was jailed during the Indian Emergency (1975-1977). In 1977, Parameswaran moved from politics to the sphere of social thought and development. He worked as director based in New Delhi for Deendayal Research Institute an organisation started by Nanaji Deshmukh for four years. P. Parameswaran, a bachelor, who didn't have a house of his own, was residing in the Vichara Kendram headquarters, Thiruvananthapuram.

In 1982, he came back to  Kerala and gave shape to a new organization; Bharatheeya Vichara Kendram aimed at national reconstruction through study and research. It has its headquarters in Thiruvananthapuram and has units all over the state. He was the Director of Bharatheeya Vichara Kendram. He has also been associated with the Vivekananda Rock Memorial and Vivekananda Kendra, Kanyakumari and has served in various capacities in the governing body of the Kendra. He was the patron of Geetha Swadhyaya Samithi, which promotes the ideology of Bhagawad Geetha amongst youth. 
 
He took initiation from Ramakrishna Mission and was a close associate and disciple of Swami Agamananda social reformer and founder of Advaita Ashrama at Kalady, the birthplace of Adi Shankara.

He has written articles and books on social, cultural and religious themes. He has delivered lectures all over the country on national issues. He participated in the Centenary celebrations of Swami Vivekananda's address at the World Parliament of Religions held at Chicago in [1893].

Social thought 
In 1998, as an answer to the rising crime rate, delinquency and other social evils in Kerala, Sri. Parameswaran proposed observation of a 'Gita decade'. Popularizing the Bhagavad Gita as a comprehensive life science was his solution to the social problems of Kerala and the whole of India. The recently conducted two‑day Gita Sangamam at Thrissur attracted around two thousand youths from all over Kerala. Eminent personalities like Padma Subrahmanyam, Justice Sukumaran etc. attended the function, which was formally inaugurated by Ananth Kumar, Union Minister for Culture, Youth Affairs and Sports. The programme of conducting one Gita Shibir in each panchayat of Kerala is on.

The International Seminar 'Bhagavad-Gita Gita and Modern problems' held at Thiruvananthapuram from 7 to 4 December 2000, in which 1500 youths, scholars and saints from all over India and abroad including Murli Manohar Joshi, Union HRD Minister and the Dalai Lama participated, was a high-water mark of the Gita Movement organized by the Gita Swadhaya Samithi under the guidance of P. Parameswaran.

Awards and recognition 
Parameswaran was awarded the Hanuman Prasad Poddar Award instituted by Bada Bazar Library of Kolkata Calcutta in 1997, in recognition of his effort in teaching the lofty principles of Hinduism to the common man.

Parameswaran has won many awards and recognitions. He was appointed as the member of the Court (Senate) of Jawaharlal Nehru University, New Delhi in 2000.

He was awarded the Amritha Keerti Puraskar by Sri Mata Amritanandamayi Math on 26 September 2002, for outstanding service to the society.  In 2004, the President of India awarded him the Padma Shri in recognition of his valuable contributions to the society. He has authored many books in Malayalam and English.

P. Parameswaran has authored several books on Indian philosophy and society. He was the editor of the magazines ‑ ''Kesari (magazine)' and 'Manthan'. He was the editor of the monthly 'Yuva Bharathi' and the quarterly 'Vivekananda Kendra Patrilka'. He has written books on Sri Aurobindo, Marx and Vivekananda, Chhatrapati Shivaji, and Swami Vivekananda's teachings. He also kept his close association with Sri Ramakrishna Math and Advaita Ashram, Kalady. He was also the recipient of Padma Vibhushan 2018.

2004 - Padma Shri
2018 - Padma Vibhushan

Works 
Sri. Parameswaran has authored several books on Indian philosophy and society. He was the editor of journals‑ 'Kesari (magazine)' and 'Manthan'. He was the editor of the monthly 'Yuva Bharathy' and the quarterly Vivekananda Kendra Patrilka and Chief Editor of 'Pragati' Quarterly Research Journal.

Books by him include:
 Sri Narayana Guru the Prophet of Renaissance.
 Sri Aravindan Bhaviyude Darsanikan.
 Vishwa Vijayi Vivekanandan.
 Marx and Vivekananda.
 From Marx to Maharshi.
 Bhagavad Gita – Vision of a New World Order.
 Beyond All Isms to Humanism.
 Heart Beats of a Hindu Nation (Compilation of selected editorials in Yuva Bharathy).
 Yajna Prasadam (Selected Poems).
 Disabodhathinate Darshanam (Selected Essays in Malayalam).
 Bhagavad-Gita  The Nectar of Immortality (Collection of Essays on Gita).
 Marunna Samoohavum Maratha Mulyangalum.
 Gita's Vision Of An Ideal Society
 Udharedathmanathmanam
 Makarajyotis(A brief study of Swami Vivekananda in Malayalam)
 Darshanasamvadam
 Swanthantra Bharatham-Gatiyum Niyathiyum
 Hindudarmavum Indian communisavum
 Vivekanandanum Prabhudha Keralavum (Edited)
 Hindutva Ideology – Unique and Universal
  Heart Beats of Hindu Nation (3 volumes)

See also 
David Frawley
Koenraad Elst
Michel Danino
Alain Danielou
Girilal Jain
Vivekananda Kendra
Vivekananda Rock Memorial

References

External links 
Speech at Mata Amitrananda Mayi madom

1927 births
2020 deaths
20th-century Indian philosophers
Kerala politicians
Recipients of the Padma Shri in literature & education
People from Alappuzha district
Rashtriya Swayamsevak Sangh pracharaks
Bharatiya Jana Sangh politicians
Indians imprisoned during the Emergency (India)
Recipients of the Padma Vibhushan in literature & education